Air-Vice Marshal Thomas Geoffrey Bowler  (1 March 1895 – 5 September 1974) was a senior Royal Air Force officer.

Bowler was educated at Bloxham School in Oxfordshire. He joined the British Army at the outbreak of the First World War, commissioning into the Dorset Regiment. He was promoted to captain on 23 August 1915, and served in the Gallipoli Campaign. He was mentioned in dispatches in 1916. In 1917, he transferred to the Royal Flying Corps. Bowler was made Flight Lieutenant (Aeroplane Branch) in 1919 in the Royal Air Force and afterwards held numerous RAF appointments in England and the Middle East. He started his service in the Second World War as a wing commander, ending the war as an air commodore. He was promoted to air-vice marshal in 1947. Bowler was made a Companion of the Order of the Bath on 7 June 1951, having retired from the Royal Air Force two months earlier.

References

1895 births
1974 deaths
Royal Air Force air marshals of World War II
Dorset Regiment officers
British Army personnel of World War I
British Army personnel of World War II
Companions of the Order of the Bath
Commanders of the Order of the British Empire
People educated at Bloxham School